Hannibal Emery Hamlin (August 22, 1858 – March 6, 1938) was an American lawyer and politician from Maine. His father, Hannibal Hamlin, served as Vice President of the United States from 1861 to 1865.

Hamlin grew up in Bangor, Maine and graduated from Colby College in 1879 and Boston University School of Law in 1882.

Residing in Ellsworth, Maine, he served in the Maine House of Representatives from 1893–1894 to 1895-1896 and in the Maine Senate from 1899 to 1902. During his second term, he was elected President of the Maine Senate (1901–1902). He later served as the president of the Maine State Bar Association from 1923 to 1924.

References

1858 births
1938 deaths
Children of vice presidents of the United States
People from Ellsworth, Maine
People from Hampden, Maine
Politicians from Bangor, Maine
Colby College alumni
Boston University School of Law alumni
Maine lawyers
Members of the Maine House of Representatives
Presidents of the Maine Senate
Maine Attorneys General
Burials at Mount Hope Cemetery (Bangor, Maine)